Ivan Bjerre Damgård (born 1956) is a Danish cryptographer and currently a professor at the Department of Computer Science, Aarhus University, Denmark.

Academic background 
In 1983, he obtained a master's degree in mathematics (with minors in music and computer science) at Aarhus University. He began his PhD studies in 1985 at the same university, and was for a period a guest researcher at CWI in Amsterdam in 1987. He earned his PhD degree in May, 1988, with the thesis Ubetinget beskyttelse i kryptografiske protokoller (Unconditional protection in cryptographic protocols) and has been employed at Aarhus University ever since. Damgård became full professor in 2005.

Research 
Damgård co-invented the Merkle–Damgård construction, which is used in influential cryptographic hash functions such as SHA-2, SHA-1 and MD5. He discovered the structure independently of Ralph Merkle and published it in 1989.

Ivan Damgård is one of the founders of the Cryptomathic company. In 2010, he was selected as IACR Fellow.

In 2021, Damgård received the ACM Symposium on Theory of Computing (STOC) Test of Time Award for the paper "Multiparty unconditionally secure protocols", which was published in STOC 1988 by Chaum, Crépeau, and Damgård.

In 2020, he received the Public Key Cryptography (PKC) conference Test of Time Award for the paper "A Generalisation, a Simplification and Some Applications of Paillier's Probabilistic Public-Key System", which was published in PKC 2001 by Damgård and Jurik.

References

External links 
 Home page of Ivan Damgård

 A list of publications of Ivan Damgård

Danish scientists
Danish computer scientists
Modern cryptographers
Living people
1956 births
International Association for Cryptologic Research fellows
Academic staff of Aarhus University